Lake Kuorevesi is a medium-sized lake in Finland. It is situated in the municipalities of Mänttä-Vilppula and Jämsä (formerly Kuorevesi) in the Central Finland region. The lake is part of the Kokemäenjoki basin. The lake drains into the Lake Ruovesi in the west and the lake Keurusselkä drains into it from the north.

See also
List of lakes in Finland

References

Kokemäenjoki basin
Mänttä-Vilppula
Landforms of Central Finland
Lakes of Jämsä